Herbert Bruce Alford Jr.  (born April 21, 1945) is a former American football player for the Washington Redskins and Buffalo Bills. He played collegiately for Texas Christian University.

College
As a placekicker, he played college football at Texas Christian University (TCU).

Professional career
Alford was drafted by the Chicago Bears in the sixth round (119th overall) of the 1967 NFL draft. After failing to make the Bears' roster after training camp, he signed with the Washington Redskins. He played in weeks 13 and 14 for the Redskins in 1967, and he was released during final roster cuts on August 28, 1968. He then played for the American Football League's Buffalo Bills in 1968 and 1969.

Personal life
He is the son of Bruce Alford Sr., who played for the New York Yankees of the All-America Football Conference (AAFC) and the New York Yanks of the NFL, and later became an on-field official.

See also
 List of American Football League players
 List of family relations in American football

References

1945 births
Living people
American football placekickers
Buffalo Bills players
TCU Horned Frogs football players
Washington Redskins players
Players of American football from Fort Worth, Texas
American Football League players